Anna Pezzetta (born 6 March 2007) is an Italian figure skater. She is the 2022 CS Ice Challenge champion, the 2022 Italian national silver medalist, and the 2023 Italian national bronze medalist.

On the junior level, Pezzetta is the 2021 Italian junior national champion and placed 13th at the 2022 World Junior Figure Skating Championships.

Personal life 
Pezzetta was born on 6 March 2007 in Bolzano, Italy.

Programs

Competitive highlights 
CS: Challenger Series; JGP: Junior Grand Prix.

References

External links 
 

2007 births
Living people
Italian female single skaters
Sportspeople from Bolzano